The relations between Canada and Mexico have evolved over time. Historic ties between the two nations were dormant, but since the 1990s relations between Canada and Mexico have positively developed, as both countries brokered the NAFTA. They were on different sides of the Cold War Spectrum (Canada was a member of NATO while Mexico was in the Non-Aligned Movement, though Mexico later left; the two countries were, however, allies in World War II).

Both nations are members of the Asia-Pacific Economic Cooperation, G-20 major economies, Lima Group, Organization of American States, Organisation for Economic Co-operation and Development and the United Nations.

History 

Before Canada became an independent nation, there had been previous contacts between Canada and Mexico in the 1800s. Canadian made products were sold in Mexico under British companies' logos. Since gaining independence from the United Kingdom in 1867; Canada delayed in establishing diplomatic relations with Mexico due to the expropriation of foreign oil companies in 1938. At the time, Canada felt obliged to follow other nations in isolating Mexico economically and diplomatically. Formal relations between the two nations did not begin until 30 January 1944, at the height of Second World War, which both countries participated in on the Allied side. In 1952, Mexico opened its first consulate-general in Montreal.

The first ever meeting between leaders of both nations took place in White Sulphur Springs, West Virginia in 1956 between Mexican President Adolfo Ruiz Cortines, Canadian Prime Minister Louis St. Laurent and American President Dwight D. Eisenhower. In 1959, President Adolfo López Mateos chose to visit Canada on his first official visit abroad. The visit was reciprocated by Prime Minister John Diefenbaker in 1960. Since then, almost every Mexican President has visited Canada at least once and almost every Canadian Prime Minister has visited Mexico.

In 1968, a joint ministerial commission was set up by both nations to meet every two years to discuss and analyze mutual interests in promoting development and deepening bilateral relations. In 1974, an agreement was signed between both nations to allow temporary migrant workers from Mexico to work in Canada.

NAFTA and since 

In 1990, leaders of Canada, Mexico and the United States began negotiating a free trade agreement that would be known as the North American Free Trade Agreement (NAFTA). Canada had just signed a free trade agreement with the United States in 1988 (FTA) when the US, under President George H. W. Bush, began to negotiate another pact with Mexico under President Carlos Salinas de Gortari.  The Canadian government under Prime Minister Brian Mulroney feared that the advantages Canada had through the Canada-US FTA would be undermined, and asked to become a party to the US-Mexican talks.   The result was that NAFTA replaced the previous Canada-US FTA. An agreement was reached between all three nations and NAFTA came into effect on 1 January 1994.  Since NAFTA has come into force, the two countries have become much more important to each other, and often collaborate when dealing with the United States.

Relations between the two governments were particularly strong during the first decade of the twenty-first century.  In October 2006, then President-elect Felipe Calderón visited Ottawa, and Prime Minister Stephen Harper attended the inauguration of President Calderón. The two leaders were ideological allies, both being pro-market conservatives, Calderón of the National Action Party and Harper of the Conservative Party.

In November 2012, President-elect Enrique Peña Nieto also chose to visit Ottawa as a president-elect before taking the presidential oath.  In an editorial in The Globe and Mail on that occasion Peña Nieto characterized the relationship before 1994 as one of "mutual benign neglect" but praised the increase in trade and travel between the two countries since NAFTA.  He called for increased Canadian foreign direct investment in Mexico, especially in the petroleum industry, though he said that Petróleos Mexicanos, the state oil company, would remain the owner of the resources.  As well he called "North American energy security" a "common goal" of both countries.  He also pledged to work to reduce drug-related violence in the country and protect visiting Canadians.  He also asked Canadians to reconsider a 2009 decision requiring Mexicans to have visas before coming to Canada.

On December 1, 2016, Canada lifted the visa requirement for Mexican citizens. On 30 November 2018, President Enrique Peña Nieto, Prime Minister Justin Trudeau and U.S. President Donald Trump signed the United States–Mexico–Canada Agreement during the G20 summit in Buenos Aires, Argentina. This agreement, if ratified by all three nations, is expected to replace NAFTA. In December 2018, Governor General Julie Payette attended the inauguration of President Andrés Manuel López Obrador.

In January 2023, Canadian Prime Minister Justin Trudeau traveled to Mexico to attend the North American Leaders' Summit in Mexico City.

High-level visits

High-level visits from Canada to Mexico
 Prime Minister John Diefenbaker (1960)
 Prime Minister Pierre Trudeau (1974, 1976, 1981, 1982)
 Prime Minister Brian Mulroney (1990)
 Prime Minister Jean Chrétien (1994, 1999, 2002, 2003)
 Prime Minister Paul Martin (2004)
 Prime Minister Stephen Harper (2006, 2009, 2012, 2014)
 Governor General Michaëlle Jean (2009, 2010)
 Prime Minister Justin Trudeau (2017, 2023)
 Governor General Julie Payette (2018)

High-level visits from Mexico to Canada
 President Adolfo López Mateos (1959)
 President Luis Echeverría Álvarez (1973)
 President José López Portillo (1980)
 President Miguel de la Madrid Hurtado (1984)
 President Ernesto Zedillo (1996, 1997, 1999)
 President Vicente Fox (2001, 2005)
 President Felipe Calderón (2007, May & June 2010)
 President Enrique Peña Nieto (2016)

Bilateral agreements 

Both nations have signed several bilateral agreements such as an Agreement on Air Transportation; Agreement on Postal Mail Exchange; Agreement on Cultural Cooperation; Treaty on the Execution of Criminal Judgments; Agreement of Environmental Cooperation; Agreement on Tourist Cooperation; Agreement on Mutual Legal Assistance Cooperation in Criminal Matters; Extradition Treaty; Agreement on Mutual Assistance and Cooperation in Customs Administrations; Agreement of Cinematographic and Audiovisual Co-production; Agreement on Cooperation in the Areas of Museums and Archaeology; Agreement for Cooperation in the Peaceful uses of Nuclear Energy; 
Agreement on Social Security; Agreement on Satellite Services; and an Agreement on Competition Laws; Agreement on the Avoidance of Double Taxation and Prevent Tax Evasion on Income.

Trade 
Twenty years after NAFTA, Mexico became the largest exporter and importer in Latin America. It exports more manufactured goods than all other Latin American countries combined. The country remains highly dependent on exports to the U.S., but it is on a path toward diversification. In 2018, two-way trade between both nations amounted to US$22.8 billion. Canada's main exports to Mexico include: seeds; aluminum alloys; wheat; vehicle and vehicle parts and accessories; diesel fuel and diesel oil and mixtures; goods for the assembly or manufacture of aircraft and airplanes (among others). Mexico's main exports to Canada include: vehicles (both passenger and transport); flat screen TVs; goods for the assembly or manufacture of aircraft and parts; piston engines parts; tractors; electronics for receiving, converting and transmitting voice feedback; and avocados (among others).

In 2017, Canadian companies invested US$2.7 billion and is the third largest foreign investor in Mexico (behind the United States and Spain). Canadian multinational companies such as Bombardier Inc., BlackBerry, Fairmont Hotels and Resorts and Scotiabank operate in Mexico. At the same time, Mexican multinational companies such as Cemex and Grupo Bimbo operate in Canada. Various Mexican beer and tequila products are sold in Canada.

Resident diplomatic missions

Resident diplomatic missions of Canada in Mexico
 Mexico City (Embassy)
 Monterrey (Consulate-General)
 Guadalajara (Consulate)
 Tijuana (Consulate)
 Acapulco (Consular agency)
 Cabo San Lucas (Consular agency)
 Cancún (Consular agency)
 Mazatlán (Consular agency)
 Playa del Carmen (Consular agency)
 Puerto Vallarta (Consular agency)

Resident diplomatic missions of Mexico in Canada
 Ottawa (Embassy)
 Montreal (Consulate-General)
 Toronto (Consulate-General)
 Vancouver (Consulate-General)
 Calgary (Consulate)
 Leamington (Consulate)

See also 

 Canada–Latin America relations
 Canadian Mexicans
 Mexican Canadians
 North American Leaders' Summit
 Seasonal Agricultural Workers Program

References 

 
Mexico
Canada